Port Micou is a historic 18th and 19th trading center on the Rappahannock River near Loretto, Essex County, Virginia. There are two remaining buildings, both built between about 1825 and 1850.  They are a large -story, wood-frame granary, and a -story, frame dwelling with a tall raised basement.

The complex was listed on the National Register of Historic Places in 1992.

References

Houses on the National Register of Historic Places in Virginia
Federal architecture in Virginia
Houses completed in 1850
Houses in Essex County, Virginia
National Register of Historic Places in Essex County, Virginia